Lingonberry juice is juice made of lingonberries. Lingonberry juice does not need preservatives like other juices as lingonberries contain benzoic acid.

Drinking lingonberry juice can reduce the risk for urinary tract infection, according to a study made by the University Hospital in Oulu, Finland.

Vargtass is a cocktail made of vodka and lingonberry juice.

References

Juice